In ballet, a variation (sometimes referred to as a pas seul, meaning to dance alone) is a solo dance. In a classical grand pas de deux, the ballerina and danseur each perform a variation.

Examples
 La Bayadère – Gamzatti, Nikiya
 Coppélia – Swanhilda 
 Le Corsaire – Medora
 Diana and Acteon – Diana
 Don Quixote – Basilio, Kitri, Cupid
 The Nutcracker – Sugar Plum Fairy
 Sleeping Beauty – Bluebird
 Swan Lake – Odile (the Black Swan)

References

Variation (ballet)